Eupithecia niphonaria is a moth in the  family Geometridae. It is found in Japan and Korea.

The wingspan is 18–21 mm. The forewing ground colour is ocherous. The hindwings are whitish with multiple transverse lines. Adults are on wing in April.

The larvae feed on Quercus phillyraeoides.

References

Moths described in 1897
niphonaria
Moths of Asia